Robert Baird may refer to:

Sir Robert Baird, 1st Baronet (died 1697), Scottish merchant, landowner, and Cashier of the Carolina Society
Sir Robert Baird, 3rd Baronet ( 1690–1740), of the Baird baronets
Robert Baird (clergyman) (1789–1863), American clergyman and author
Robert Baird (cyclist) (born 1942), Australian cyclist
Robert Baird (flying ace) (1921–1992), American Marine flying ace
Robert Baird (swimmer) (born 1973), Canadian medley swimmer
Robert L. Baird (1920–2005), American jockey
Robert L. Baird, screenplay writer on Curious George (film) and others
Robert W. Baird (1883–1968), American businessman
Robert W. Baird & Company
Bob Baird (1940–1974), American baseball player